Walter Jost (25 July 1896 – 24 April 1945) was a German general during World War II. He was a recipient of the Knight's Cross of the Iron Cross of Nazi Germany. Jost was killed in action on 24 April 1945 in Villadose. Troops under his command participated in the Ronchidoso massacre in Emilia-Romagna between 28 and 30 November 1944, when 66 civilians were executed.

Awards

 Knight's Cross of the Iron Cross on 31 March 1942 as Oberst and commander of Infanterie-Regiment 75

References

Citations

Bibliography

1896 births
1945 deaths
German Army personnel killed in World War II
German Army personnel of World War I
Lieutenant generals of the German Army (Wehrmacht)
People from the Grand Duchy of Baden
People from Rastatt
Recipients of the clasp to the Iron Cross, 1st class
Recipients of the Knight's Cross of the Iron Cross
Military personnel from Baden-Württemberg
Nazi war criminals